Memorial Stadium was a stadium located in Johnny Appleseed Park in Fort Wayne, Indiana. It was primarily used for baseball, and was the home field of the Fort Wayne Wizards of the Midwest League baseball team. Memorial Stadium was dedicated on April 18, 1993 before a sold-out crowd.

One of the most historic moments for the stadium came April 24, 1994 when Alex Rodriguez hit the first professional home run of his career.

Memorial Stadium hosted its final baseball game August 28, 2008, with 6,106 in attendance, between the Wizards and South Bend Silver Hawks. Highlights included the ceremonial first pitch thrown by 2008 Summer Olympic Gold medalist Lloy Ball and the national anthem performed by the Fort Wayne Philharmonic Orchestra. The final attendance recorded for Memorial Stadium was 4,046,261.

Memorial Stadium's replacement, Parkview Field, opened for the 2009 season in downtown Fort Wayne as the new home for the franchise. In the summer of 2009, Memorial Stadium was demolished.

References

External links
Small Parks
Ball Park Reviews
Harrison Square
Memorial Stadium Views - Ball Parks of the Minor Leagues

Defunct baseball venues in the United States
Defunct sports venues in Indiana
Baseball venues in Indiana